CinefestOZ is an annual film festival that takes place over five days in the South West region of Western Australia. IndigifestOZ is a section of the festival devoted to Aboriginal and Torres Strait Islander filmmakers.

History
The CinefestOZ film festival was founded in 2008 by David Barton and Helen Shervington, "as a cultural celebration of the French bicentenary of Antipodean exploration of the South West corner of Western Australia". The opening film at the inaugural festival was the highly-acclaimed Australian film Black Balloon.

The festival has staged IndigifestOZ since 2015, which provides a showcase for Aboriginal and Torres Strait Islander filmmakers.

Description
The events are staged in Busselton, the Margaret River wine region, Bunbury, Dunsborough, and Augusta. The festival showcases Australian and French films, and awards the CinefestOZ Film Prize of $100,000AUD, to feature films and documentaries first screened in Western Australia. The CinefestOZ prize is the largest cash film prize in Australia, and one of the largest in the world.

Recent activities
The 2021 festival was the 14th edition, taking place from 25 to 29 August 2021. The feature documentary film Under the Volcano, produced by WA producer Cody Greenwood and directed by Gracie Otto, had its Australian premiere at the festival, while Akoni, a film about a Nigerian refugee struggling to integrate into Australian society by Australian filmmaker Genna Chanelle Hayes, had its world premiere.

The Australian drama film Nitram, based on the 1996 Port Arthur massacre, won the 2021 Film Prize.

References

External links

2008 establishments in Australia
Film festivals established in 2008
Film festivals in Australia
Australian film awards
Annual events in Australia
August events
South West (Western Australia)